Pyrausta fieldialis is a moth in the family Crambidae. It is found in Brazil (Parana).

References

Moths described in 1933
fieldialis
Moths of South America